Campesino means 'farmer' or 'peasant' in Spanish.

Campesino may refer to:

 Tenant farmer or farm worker in Latin America
 Los Campesinos!, an indie pop band from Cardiff, Wales
 Teatro Campesino, a theater group founded by the United Farm Workers
 Valentín González, El Campesino, a military leader during the Spanish Civil War
 Via Campesina, the collaborating body for an international peasant movement
 Bloque Obrero y Campesino, the Workers and Peasants' Bloc in 1930s Barcelona
 Confederación Revolucionaria de Obreros y Campesinos, Mexico
 Confederación Sindical Única de Trabajadores Campesinos de Bolivia, Unique Confederation of Rural Laborers of Bolivia